The men's decathlon at the 2009 World Championships in Athletics was held at the Olympic Stadium on August 19 and August 20. The competition is notable for having the highest number of competitors (38) and the highest fraction of athletes (almost 90%) finishing the competition in the World Championships history.

Medalists

Records
Prior to the competition, the following records were as follows.

Qualification standards

Schedule

Results

100 metres

Long jump

Shot put

High jump

400 metres

110 metres hurdles

Discus throw

Pole vault

Javelin throw

1500 metres

Final standings

Key:  PB = Personal best, SB = Seasonal best, WL = World leading (in a given season)

See also
2009 Hypo-Meeting
Athletics at the 2009 Summer Universiade – Men's decathlon

References
General
decathlon2000
Specific

Decathlon
Decathlon at the World Athletics Championships